The Roman aqueduct of Vieu (French:Aqueduc romain de Vieu) is a Roman underground aqueduct located in Vieu in the French department of Ain in the Auvergne-Rhône-Alpes region.

It was classified as a historical monument by the list of 1840.

References 

Roman aqueducts in France
Auvergne-Rhône-Alpes